Michael Kinzer House is a historic home located at Blacksburg, Montgomery County, Virginia.  It was built about 1845, and is a two-story, four-bay brick two-room-plan house. It features a decorative brick cornice.  Also on the property is the contributing site of a brick kiln.

It was listed on the National Register of Historic Places in 1989.

References

Houses on the National Register of Historic Places in Virginia
Houses completed in 1845
Houses in Montgomery County, Virginia
Buildings and structures in Blacksburg, Virginia
National Register of Historic Places in Montgomery County, Virginia